Kirill Valeryevich Marushchak (born 16 May 1986) is a Russian former professional football player.

Club career
He made his Russian Football National League debut for FC Volgar-Gazprom Astrakhan on 27 March 2010 in a game against FC KAMAZ Naberezhnye Chelny.

External links
 

1985 births
Sportspeople from Kaliningrad
Living people
Russian footballers
Association football defenders
FC Volgar Astrakhan players
FC Baltika Kaliningrad players
FC Yenisey Krasnoyarsk players
FC Luch Vladivostok players
FC Dynamo Saint Petersburg players
FC Dynamo Bryansk players